Allen Henry Greenfield is an American occultist, UFOlogist, and author long involved in the free illuminist movement. He was consecrated as Tau Sir Hasirim in 1993 by Hierophant Michael Bertiaux of Chicago, Illinois. He was a member of Ordo Templi Orientis and editor of the Eulis Lodge journal LAShTAL, but has parted ways with the OTO in favor of the broadly-based Free Illuminist movement.

His episcopal title "Tau" is sometimes abbreviated as "T" and prefixed to his legal name, and thus he may also be referred to as T Allen Greenfield.

Career
A past (elected) member of the Society for Psychical Research and the National Investigations Committee on Aerial Phenomena (from 1960), Greenfield has twice been the recipient of the "UFOlogist of the Year Award" of the National UFO Conference (1972 and 1992).

Greenfield was elected to the mystical episcopate of the Neopythagorean Gnostic Assembly in 1986 and again in 1994. He was consecrated within the Ordo Templi Orientis (OTO) by Frater Superior William Breeze on November 19, 1988. He was consecrated Tau Sir Hasirim on December 4, 1993, by Hierophant Michael Bertiaux of Chicago, Illinois. He was reconsecrated by OTO U.S. Grand Master General David Scriven on May 25, 1997. As a member of Ordo Templi Orientis, he held the position of editor of the Eulis Lodge journal LAShTAL.

In February 2006, Greenfield began to criticize Ordo Templi Orientis upper management. He called for their resignation and stepped down from all managerial duties in protest, issuing a strong criticism of the current Outer Head of the Order, William Breeze. This was accepted as a full resignation from the Order. Since then, Greenfield has devoted his energies to the worldwide Free Illuminist or Congregational Illuminist Movement.

Works
His book Secret Cipher of the UFOnauts discusses UFOs in terms derived from Carl Jung, according to Robert Anton Wilson. In it, extended  the work of James Lees, Carol Smith, and Jake Stratton-Kent, by taking the  English Qaballa, also known the "ALW cipher" or "NAEQ Cipher" and started to put non-Thelamic words and phases through it with very interesting results.  His research into non-standard use of the cipher eventually culminated in his book  "The Complete Secret Cipher of the UFOnauts".

His The Story of the Hermetic Brotherhood of Light includes discussion of the Hermetic Brotherhood of Light vs. Helena Blavatsky's Brotherhood of Luxor but is, according to a reviewer in Aries, to be used "with care".

Books

.

.
.
.
.
.
.
.

Contributions

References

Citations

Works cited

Further reading

Reviews

External links

Allen H. Greenfield: Astrological Article and Chart
Letters from Doreen Valiente to Rev. T. Allen Greenfield

Year of birth missing (living people)
Living people
American occult writers
American UFO writers
Members of Ordo Templi Orientis
People involved in plagiarism controversies
Ufologists